The eighth season of Friends, an American sitcom created by David Crane and Marta Kauffman, premiered on NBC on September 27, 2001. Friends was produced by Bright/Kauffman/Crane Productions, in association with Warner Bros. Television. The season contains 24 episodes and concluded airing on May 16, 2002. This season had an average of 24.5 million viewers, and was the most watched TV show of the 2001–02 television season.

Reception
Collider wrote that it was the show's best season, and called its highlight "The One with the Rumor".

Cast and characters

(In particular, Introduced in season 8 or Only in season 8)

Main cast
 Jennifer Aniston as Rachel Green
 Courteney Cox-Arquette as Monica Geller
 Lisa Kudrow as Phoebe Buffay
 Matt LeBlanc as Joey Tribbiani
 Matthew Perry as Chandler Bing
 David Schwimmer as Ross Geller

Recurring cast
 Elliott Gould as Jack Geller
 Christina Pickles as Judy Geller
 Bonnie Somerville as Mona
 Sean Penn as Eric
 Alec Baldwin as Parker
 James Michael Tyler as Gunther

Guest stars
 Maggie Wheeler as Janice Litman-Goralnik
 Morgan Fairchild as Nora Bing
 Eddie Cahill as Tag Jones
 Marlo Thomas as Sandra Green
 Ron Leibman as Dr. Leonard Green
 June Gable as Estelle Leonard
 Brad Pitt as Will Colbert
 Trudie Styler as Herself
 Johnny Messner as Kash
 Rena Sofer as Katie
 Maurice Godin as Sid
 Eddie McClintock as Clifford 'Cliff' Burnett
 Sam McMurray as Doug
 Geoff Pierson as Mr. Franklin
 Arden Myrin as Brenda
 Fred Stoller as Stu
 Harry Van Gorkum as Don
 James LeGros as Jim
 Cole Sprouse as Ben
 Steve Ireland as Mr. Zelner

Episodes

United States ratings
Season 8 averaged 24.5 million viewers and finished, for the first time, as the most watched show of the 2001–02 television season.

Notes

References

External links

 
 The One With The Tea Leaves script at livesinabox.com

08
2001 American television seasons
2002 American television seasons